Camera dei Deputati is an Italian TV channel dedicated to broadcast live coverage of Italian Chamber of Deputies from Palazzo Montecitorio in Rome, Italy.

Free-to-air
Television channels and stations established in 1996
RAI television channels
Commercial-free television networks
Legislature broadcasters
Italian-language television stations
Chamber of Deputies (Italy)